The Green River is an  tributary of the Rock River in northwestern Illinois in the United States.  Via the Rock, it is part of the Mississippi River watershed.  Much of the Green's course has been straightened and channelized.

Course
The Green rises in northern Lee County and flows initially southwestward through Lee, Whiteside and Bureau Counties, passing the town of Amboy.  It turns westward in Bureau County and flows into Henry County, where it roughly parallels the Hennepin Canal and passes the towns of Colona and Green Rock.  It joins the Rock River just west of Green Rock, in the Quad Cities metropolitan area.

See also
List of Illinois rivers

References

Rivers of Illinois
Rivers of Lee County, Illinois
Rivers of Whiteside County, Illinois
Rivers of Bureau County, Illinois
Rivers of Henry County, Illinois